Gladiator is a 2000s epic historical drama film directed by Ridley Scott and written by David Franzoni, John Logan, and William Nicholson. The film was co-produced and released by DreamWorks Pictures and Universal Pictures. DreamWorks Pictures distributed the film in North America while Universal Pictures released it internationally through United International Pictures. It stars Russell Crowe, Joaquin Phoenix, Connie Nielsen, Ralf Möller, Oliver Reed (in his final role), Djimon Hounsou, Derek Jacobi, John Shrapnel, Richard Harris, and Tommy Flanagan. Crowe portrays Roman general Maximus Decimus Meridius, who is betrayed when Commodus, the ambitious son of Emperor Marcus Aurelius, murders his father and seizes the throne. Reduced to slavery, Maximus becomes a gladiator and rises through the ranks of the arena to avenge the murders of his family and his emperor.

Inspired by Daniel P. Mannix's 1958 book Those About to Die (formerly titled The Way of the Gladiator), the film's script, initially written by Franzoni, was acquired by DreamWorks and Ridley Scott signed on to direct the film. Principal photography, which began in January 1999 and wrapped up in May of that year, was known to have a set of problems due to the script being unfinished. Several of the cast complained about the writing quality throughout the nineteen week shoot in Fort Ricasoli, Malta, forcing many rewrites. Complications of the film's production were made worse when Reed died of a heart attack before production wrapped. British post-production company The Mill, who constructed the film's computer-generated imagery effects, had to create a digital body double for the remaining scenes involving Reed's character Proximo.

Despite its troubled production, Gladiator was anticipated to be one of the year's most successful films. On its release, the film grossed over $503 million worldwide, becoming the second highest-grossing film of 2000 behind Mission: Impossible 2. Critics praised the acting (particularly Crowe's and Phoenix's performances), Scott's direction, visuals, screenplay, action sequences, musical score, and the production values, although its dark and brooding tone was criticized. Winning numerous accolades, Gladiator won five Academy Awards at the 73rd Academy Awards, including Best Picture and Best Actor for Crowe. Gladiator both revitalized or established the careers of its cast and crew, particularly elevating Crowe to leading man status and turning Phoenix into a celebrity.

Since its release, Gladiator has been critically reevaluated and it has been considered one of the best films of the 2000s and one of the greatest historical epic films ever made. It has been credited with reinventing the sword-and-sandal genre after the genre waned in the public eye during the 1960s and also rekindled interest in entertainment centered around the cultures of ancient Greece, Rome, and other time periods throughout world history. Several films have attempted to emulate Gladiator's visuals, style, and tone with varying degrees of success. The film has been analyzed for its themes of revenge, violence, masculinity, and stoicism. In 2021, Scott officially announced that writing had begun on a sequel to the film, which is scheduled to be released in the United States on November 22, 2024.

Plot
In 180 AD, Hispano-Roman General Maximus Decimus Meridius intends to return home after he leads the Roman army to victory against the Germanic tribes near Vindobona on the Limes Germanicus. Emperor Marcus Aurelius tells Maximus that his own son, Commodus, is unfit to rule and that he wishes Maximus to succeed him, as regent, to help save Rome from corruption and restore the republic. When told of this, Commodus privately murders his father.

Commodus proclaims himself the new emperor, asking Maximus for his loyalty, but he refuses. Maximus is arrested by the Praetorian Guard and is told that he and his family will die. He kills his captors and, wounded, rides for his home near Turgalium (now Trujillo), where he finds his wife and son crucified. Maximus buries them, then collapses from his injuries. Slavers find him, and take him to the city of Zucchabar in the Roman province of Mauretania Caesariensis, where he is sold to gladiator trainer Proximo.

Maximus reluctantly fights in local tournaments, his combat skills helping him win matches and gain popularity. He befriends two other gladiators: Hagen, a German; and Juba, a Numidian. Proximo reveals to Maximus that he was once a gladiator who was freed by Marcus Aurelius, and advises him to "win the crowd" to win his freedom.

When Commodus organises 150 days of games to commemorate his father's death, Proximo takes his gladiators to Rome to fight in the Colosseum. Disguised in a masked helmet, Maximus debuts in the Colosseum as a Carthaginian in a re-enactment of the Battle of Zama. Unexpectedly, he leads his side to victory, and Commodus enters the Colosseum to offer his congratulations. He orders the disguised Maximus, as leader of the gladiators, to reveal his identity; Maximus removes his helmet and declares vengeance. Commodus is compelled by the crowd to let the gladiators live, and his guards are held back from striking them down.

Maximus's next fight is against a legendary undefeated gladiator, Tigris of Gaul. Commodus arranges for several tigers to be set upon Maximus during the duel, but Maximus manages to prevail. Commodus orders Maximus to kill Tigris, but Maximus spares his opponent's life; in response, the crowd chants "Maximus the Merciful", angering Commodus.

Maximus discovers from Cicero, his ex-orderly, that his former legions remain loyal. He meets in secret with Lucilla, Commodus's sister and once the lover of Maximus; and Gracchus, an influential senator. They agree to have Maximus escape Rome to join his legions, topple Commodus by force, and hand power back to the Roman Senate. Commodus learns of the plot when Lucilla's son, Lucius, innocently hints at the conspiracy. Commodus threatens Lucilla and Lucius, and has the Praetorian Guard arrest Gracchus and attack the gladiators' barracks. Proximo and his men, including Hagen, sacrifice themselves to enable Maximus to escape. Maximus is captured at the rendezvous with Cicero, where the latter is killed.

In an effort to win back public approval, Commodus challenges Maximus to a duel in the Colosseum. He stabs Maximus in the lung before the match to gain an advantage. Despite his injuries, Maximus disarms Commodus. After the Praetorian Guard refuses to aid him, Commodus unsheathes a hidden knife; Maximus overpowers Commodus and drives the knife into his throat, killing him. Before Maximus succumbs to his wounds, he asks for political reforms, for his gladiator allies to be freed, and for Senator Gracchus to be reinstated. As he dies, he has a vision where he reunites with his wife and son. His friends and allies honor him as "a soldier of Rome", at Lucilla's behest, and carry his body out of the arena.

That night, Juba visits the Colosseum and buries figurines of Maximus's wife and son at the spot where he died.

Cast

 Russell Crowe as Maximus Decimus Meridius: A Hispano-Roman legatus forced into becoming a slave who seeks revenge against Commodus. He has earned the favor of Marcus Aurelius, and the love and admiration of Lucilla prior to the events of the film. His home is near Trujillo in today's Province of Cáceres, Spain. After the murder of his family, he vows vengeance.
 Joaquin Phoenix as Commodus: The amoral, power-hungry, embittered son of Marcus Aurelius. He murders his father when he learns that Maximus will hold the emperor's powers in trust until a new republic can be formed.
 Connie Nielsen as Lucilla: Maximus's former lover and the older child of Marcus Aurelius. Lucilla has been recently widowed. She resists her brother's incestuous advances, while protecting her son, Lucius, from her brother's corruption and wrath.
 Oliver Reed as Antonius Proximo: An old, gruff gladiator trainer who buys Maximus in North Africa. A former gladiator himself, he was freed by Marcus Aurelius and becomes a mentor to both Maximus and Juba. This was Reed's final film appearance, as he died during the filming. In the original film script, Proximo was supposed to live. Richard Harris, who was later cast as Marcus Aurelius, was considered for the part.
 Derek Jacobi as Senator Gracchus: A member of the Roman Senate who opposes Commodus's rule and an ally of Lucilla and Maximus. In the original film script, Gracchus was supposed to die.
 Djimon Hounsou as Juba: A Numidian tribesman who was taken from his home and family by slave traders. He becomes Maximus's closest ally and friend, and inspires Maximus to bring down Commodus for the greater good before he joins his family in the afterlife.
 Richard Harris as Marcus Aurelius: The old and wise emperor of Rome who appoints Maximus, whom he loves as a son, to be his successor, with the ultimate aim of returning Rome to a republican form of government. He is murdered by his son Commodus before his wish can be fulfilled.
 Ralf Möller as Hagen: A Germanic warrior and Proximo's chief gladiator who later befriends Maximus and Juba during their battles in Rome. He is killed by the Praetorian Guard during Maximus's attempted escape from Rome.
 Tommy Flanagan as Cicero: Maximus's loyal servant who provides liaison between the enslaved Maximus, his former legion based at Ostia, and Lucilla. He is used as bait for the escaping Maximus and eventually killed by the Praetorian Guard.
 David Schofield as Senator Falco: A patrician, a senator opposed to Gracchus. He helps Commodus to consolidate his power.
 John Shrapnel as Senator Gaius: A Roman senator allied with Gracchus, Lucilla, and Maximus against Commodus.
 Tomas Arana as Quintus (Loosely based on Quintus Aemilius Laetus): A Roman legatus, commander of the Praetorian Guard, who betrays Maximus by allying with Commodus. In the extended version, Quintus sees the mad side of Commodus when he is forced to execute two innocent men. Quintus later redeems himself by refusing to allow Commodus a second sword during the latter's duel with Maximus and promises to honor Maximus's last wishes.
 Spencer Treat Clark as Lucius Verus: The young son of Lucilla. He is named after his father Lucius Verus, who was co-emperor until 169 AD. He is also the grandson of Marcus Aurelius. He idolizes Maximus for his victories in the arena.
 David Hemmings as Cassius: The master of ceremonies for the gladiatorial games in the Colosseum.
 Sven-Ole Thorsen as Tigris of Gaul. The only undefeated Gladiator was brought out of retirement by Commodus to kill Maximus.
 Omid Djalili as a slave trader.
 Giannina Facio as Maximus's wife.
 Giorgio Cantarini as Maximus's son, who is the same age as Lucilla's son Lucius.
 John Quinn as Valerius, a Roman general in the army of Maximus Decimus Meridius.

Production

Development 

David Franzoni, who wrote the first draft, had dropped out of graduate school by 1972 and took his downtime to ride across Eastern Europe on a motorcade. During his trip, Franzoni was amazed that "everywhere I went in Europe, there were arenas. Even as I went east, going through Turkey, I began to think to myself this must have been a hell of a franchise." During a stop in Baghdad, Iraq, he stopped reading a book about the Irish Revolution for another one: Daniel P. Mannix's 1958 novel Those About to Die. These trips helped Franzoni inspire many ideas about a story set in the Roman Empire.

Twenty-five years later, Franzoni wrote the screenplay for Steven Spielberg's Amistad, which was the director's first film for DreamWorks Pictures, for which Speilberg was one of the three founders of the newly created independent studio. Though Amistad was a moderate commercial success, DreamWorks was impressed with Franzoni's screenplay and given him a three-picture deal as writer and co-producer. Remembering his 1972 trip, Franzoni pitched his Roman History idea to Spielberg, who immediately told him to write the script.

In Franzoni's first draft, dated April 4, 1998, Franzoni chose to base his story on Commodus after reading the ancient Roman Historia Augusta. He later named his protagonist Narcissus, a wrestler who, according to the ancient sources Herodian and Cassius Dio, strangled Emperor Commodus to death.

Ridley Scott was approached by producers Walter F. Parkes and Douglas Wick. They showed him a copy of Jean-Léon Gérôme's 1872 painting entitled Pollice Verso (Thumbs Down). Scott was enticed by filming the world of Ancient Rome. However, Scott felt Franzoni's dialogue was too "on the nose" (lacking subtlety) and hired John Logan to rewrite the script to his liking. Logan rewrote much of the first act and made the decision to kill off Maximus's family to increase the character's motivation.

By the time the script was being revised and the production crew was being assembled, DreamWorks began circling several potential partners to help cover the film's budget and costs. Co-financing between studios became increasingly common during the late-1990s as production and marketing costs and the potential for losses spiralled upward. DreamWorks saw success with its split-rights deals as the studio shared financing and distribution for the 1998 films Saving Private Ryan and Deep Impact with Paramount Pictures. On November 12, 1998, Variety reported that Universal Pictures reached a deal with DreamWorks to help finance the film, as well as obtaining international distribution rights and splitting worldwide proceeds 50–50 with DreamWorks, who would distribute the film in North America.

Casting 

While writing the script, Franzoni expressed interest in Antonio Banderas as the lead role, but he declined. Mel Gibson, Tom Sizemore, and Tom Cruise were considered for the film, but the producers and studio had Russell Crowe at the top of their list after his breakout performance in L.A. Confidential (1997). Crowe was initially hesitant to take the role due to gaining forty pounds for The Insider (1999), but director Michael Mann convinced the actor to take the role. He eventually signed on to play the main character in September 1998. Crowe would state that he was pitched by Parkes without the script finished. In his interview for Inside the Actors Studio: "They said, 'It's a 100-million-dollar film. You're being directed by Ridley Scott. You play a Roman General.' I've always been a big fan of Ridley's."

For the role of Commodus, Jude Law auditioned for the role, but Scott intended to cast Joaquin Phoenix as his choice for the role. Jennifer Lopez reportedly lobbied for the role of Lucilla, but lost the role to Connie Nielsen. Crowe initially suggested his Insider costar Christopher Plummer for the role of Marcus Aurelius before Richard Harris was cast in the role. From there, Ralf Möller, Oliver Reed, Djimon Hounsou, Derek Jacobi, John Shrapnel, and Tommy Flanagan joined the cast as pre-production was ready to commence.

Pre-production 
In preparation for filming, Scott spent several months developing storyboards to develop the framework of the plot. Over six weeks, production members scouted various locations within the extent of the Roman Empire before its collapse, including Italy, France, North Africa, and England. All of the film's props, sets, and costumes were manufactured by crew members due to the high costs and unavailability of the items.

Influences 
Scott and Franzoni drew on several influences for Gladiator, including One Flew Over the Cuckoo’s Nest, La Dolce Vita and The Conformist. The film's plot was influenced by two 1960s Hollywood films of the sword-and-sandal genre, The Fall of the Roman Empire and Spartacus, and shares several plot points with The Fall of the Roman Empire, which tells the story of Livius, who, like Maximus in Gladiator, is Marcus Aurelius's intended successor. Livius is in love with Lucilla and seeks to marry her while Maximus, who is happily married, was formerly in love with her. Both films portray the death of Marcus Aurelius as an assassination. In The Fall of the Roman Empire a group of conspirators independent of Commodus, hoping to profit from Commodus's accession, arrange for Marcus Aurelius to be poisoned. In Gladiator Commodus himself murders his father by smothering him. 

In the course of The Fall of the Roman Empire Commodus unsuccessfully seeks to win Livius over to his vision of empire in contrast to that of his father, but continues to employ him notwithstanding; in Gladiator, when Commodus fails to secure Maximus's allegiance, he executes Maximus's wife and son and tries unsuccessfully to execute him. Livius in The Fall of the Roman Empire and Maximus in Gladiator kill Commodus in single combat, Livius to save Lucilla and Maximus to avenge the murder of his wife and son, and both do it for the greater good of Rome.

Scott cited Spartacus and Ben-Hur as influences on the film: "These movies were part of my cinema-going youth. But at the dawn of the new millennium, I thought this might be the ideal time to revisit what may have been the most important period of the last two thousand years – if not all recorded history – the apex and beginning of the decline of the greatest military and political power the world has ever known."

Spartacus provides the film's gladiatorial motif, as well as the character of Senator Gracchus, a fictitious senator, bearing the name of a pair of revolutionary tribunes from the 2nd century BC, who in both films is an elder statesman of ancient Rome attempting to preserve the ancient rights of the Roman Senate in the face of an ambitious autocrat – Marcus Licinius Crassus in Spartacus and Commodus in Gladiator. Both actors who played Gracchus (in Spartacus and Gladiator) played Claudius in previous films: Charles Laughton of Spartacus played Claudius in the unfinished 1937 film I, Claudius and Derek Jacobi of Gladiator played Claudius in the 1976 BBC adaptation. Both films also share a specific set piece wherein a gladiator (Maximus here, Woody Strode's Draba in Spartacus) throws his weapon into a spectator box at the end of a match, as well as at least one line of dialogue: "Rome is the mob", said here by Gracchus and by Julius Caesar (John Gavin) in Spartacus.

Filming

Principal photography 
The film was shot in three main locations between January and May 1999. The opening battle scenes in the forests of Germania were shot in three weeks in the Bourne Woods, near Farnham, Surrey, in England. When Scott learned that the Forestry Commission planned to remove a section of the forest, he persuaded them to allow the battle scene to be shot there and burn it down. Scott and cinematographer John Mathieson used multiple cameras filming at various frame rates and a 45-degree shutter, creating stop motion effects in the action sequences, similar to techniques used for the battle sequences of Saving Private Ryan (1998). 

The scenes of slavery, desert travel, and gladiatorial training school were shot in Ouarzazate, Morocco, just south of the Atlas Mountains over a further three weeks. To construct the arena where Maximus has his first fights, the crew used basic materials and local building techniques to manufacture the 30,000-seat mud brick arena. The scenes of Ancient Rome were shot over a period of nineteen weeks in Fort Ricasoli, Malta.

The other two-thirds and remaining height were added digitally. The replica took several months to build and cost an estimated $1 million. The reverse side of the complex supplied a rich assortment of Ancient Roman street furniture, colonnades, gates, statuary, and marketplaces for other filming requirements. The complex was serviced by tented "costume villages" that had to change rooms, storage, armorers, and other facilities. The rest of the Colosseum was created in computer-generated imagery using set-design blueprints and textures referenced from live action, and rendered in three layers to provide lighting flexibility for compositing in Flame and Inferno software.

While Crowe and Harris became good friends during filming, the actor did not get along with Reed. In a 2010 interview with GQ, Crowe stated that he "never got on with Ollie. He has visited me in dreams and asked me to talk kindly of him. So I should... but we never had a pleasant conversation." Crowe was uncomfortable with Reed's excessive drinking during filming. Phoenix was initially anxious about filming and requested Scott he dropped out early, but to help calm a then 25-year-old Phoenix's nerves, Crowe and Harris decided to get him drunk. "It was actually Richard Harris' idea," Crowe later recalled, "because Joaquin was very nervous on the set and I went to Richard and said, 'Mate, what are we gonna do with this kid, he's asking me to abuse him before takes.'"

Script revisions and complaints 
Throughout filmmaking, the actors complained about the problems with the script. William Nicholson was brought to Shepperton Studios to make Maximus a more sensitive character. Nicholson reworked Maximus' friendship with Juba and developed the afterlife thread in the film, saying, "he did not want to see a film about a man who wanted to kill somebody." The screenplay faced many rewrites and revisions, with several actors providing changes. Crowe questioned every aspect of the evolving script and strode off the set when he did not get answers. According to Nicholson, Crowe reportedly told him that his "lines are garbage, but I'm the greatest actor in the world and I can make even garbage sound good."

According to a DreamWorks executive, Crowe "tried to rewrite the entire script on the spot. You know the big line in the trailer, 'In this life or the next, I will have my vengeance'? At first he absolutely refused to say it." Crowe described the script situation: "I read the script and it was substantially underdone. Even the character didn't exist on the pages. And that set about a long process, that's probably the first time that I've been in a situation where the script wasn't a complete done deal. We actually started shooting with about 32 pages and went through them in the first couple of weeks." 

Of the writing and filming process, Crowe added, "Possibly, a lot of the stuff that I have to deal with now in terms of my 'volatility' has to do with that experience. Here was a situation where we got to Morocco with a crew of 200 and a cast of a 100 or whatever, and I didn't have anything to learn. I actually didn't know what the scenes were gonna be. We had, I think, one American writer working on it, one English writer working on it, and of course a group of producers who were also adding their ideas, and then Ridley himself; and then, on the occasion where Ridley would say, 'Look, this is the structure for it– what are you gonna say in that?' So then I'd be doing my own stuff, as well. And this is how things like, 'Strength and honor,' came up. This is how things like, 'At my signal, unleash hell,' came up. The name Maximus Decimus Meridius, it just flowed well."

Maximus' habit of rubbing soil before each fight references the attachment and affection to his former life as a farmer. In a conversation with Marcus Aurelius, Maximus says the fecund soil of his farm is "black like my wife's hair". Crowe wrote the speech himself, drawing on his feelings of homesickness for his own farm.

Injuries 
Crowe reportedly sustained injuries during principal photography. Detailing the impact filming had on his body during his appearance on Inside the Actor's Studio, Crowe described that there was a "lot of blood, lot of blood, lot of grazes, you know, I mean, I've still got, a lot of little scar[s] here and one under here on this elbow, a discoloration of the skin that is directly to Gladiator". During filming on the sequence where Maximus fights Tigris of Gaul in the arena with tigers, Crowe narrowly escaped from being clawed by a tiger.

Post-production

British post-production company The Mill was responsible for much of the computer-generated imagery effects that were added after filming. The company was responsible for such tricks as compositing real tigers filmed on bluescreen into the fight sequences, and adding smoke trails and extending the flight paths of the opening scene's salvo of flaming arrows to get around regulations on how far they could be shot during filming. They also used 2,000 live actors to create a computer-generated crowd of 35,000 virtual actors that had to look believable and react to fight scenes. The Mill accomplished this by shooting live actors at different angles giving various performances, and then mapping them onto cards, with motion-capture tools used to track their movements for three-dimensional compositing. The Mill created over 90 visual effects shots, comprising approximately nine minutes of the film's running time.

An unexpected post-production job was caused by the death of Oliver Reed of a heart attack during the filming in Malta before all his scenes had been shot. The Mill created a digital body double for the remaining scenes involving his character Proximo by photographing a live-action body double in the shadows and by mapping a three-dimensional computer-generated imagery mask of Reed's face to the remaining scenes during production at an estimated cost of $3.2 million for two minutes of additional footage. Visual effects supervisor John Nelson reflected on the decision to include the additional footage: "What we did was small compared to our other tasks on the film. What Oliver did was much greater. He gave an inspiring, moving performance. All we did was help him finish it." The film is dedicated to Reed's memory.

Music 

The Oscar-nominated score was composed by Hans Zimmer and Lisa Gerrard, and conducted by Gavin Greenaway. Zimmer was originally planning to use Israeli vocalist Ofra Haza for the score, after his work with her in The Prince of Egypt. However, Haza died in late February 2000, before she was able to record, and so Gerrard was chosen instead. Lisa Gerrard's vocals are similar to her own work on The Insider score. The music for many of the battle scenes has been noted as similar to Gustav Holst's "Mars: The Bringer of War", and in June 2006, the Holst Foundation sued Hans Zimmer for allegedly copying the late Holst's work. 

Another close musical resemblance occurs in the scene of Commodus's triumphal entry into Rome, accompanied by music clearly evocative of two sections – the Prelude to Das Rheingold and Siegfried's Funeral March from Götterdämmerung – from Richard Wagner's Ring of the Nibelung. On February 27, 2001, nearly a year after the first soundtrack's release, Decca produced Gladiator: More Music From the Motion Picture. Then, on September 5, 2005, Decca produced Gladiator: Special Anniversary Edition, a two-CD pack containing both the above-mentioned releases. Some of the music from the film was featured in the NFL playoffs in January 2003 before commercial breaks and before and after half-time. In 2003, Luciano Pavarotti released a recording of himself singing a song from the film and said he regretted turning down an offer to perform on the soundtrack.

Release

Context 

The theatrical year of 1999 achieved a record $7.3 billion at the domestic box office, thanks largely to the success of Star Wars: Episode I — The Phantom Menace and The Sixth Sense. Industry executives did not expect 2000 to replicate that success to have its slate of films lacking the commercial appeal to 1999's slate. A lack of femme-driven pictures were notably absent from the action-orientated blockbusters were predicted to see the biggest success. Rises in production costs and a lack of merchandising forced studios to concentrate their marketing on the appeal of popular actors such as Tom Cruise, Mel Gibson, Eddie Murphy, Harrison Ford, Jim Carrey, and Bruce Willis to help boost ticket sales and draw in potential female audiences for their slates. 

The action sequel Mission: Impossible 2 was expected to have the biggest success, while anticipated films such as Dinosaur, Gladiator, The Patriot, and X-Men were also expected to perform well. Films such as Battlefield Earth, Gone in 60 Seconds, The Kid, Me, Myself & Irene, Nutty Professor II: The Klumps, The Perfect Storm, and What Lies Beneath were heavily marketed and promoted with the appeal of their leading actors that already had a built-in audience. Gladiator was expected to perform well following successful test screenings that DreamWorks conducted between October 1999 and February 2000 that were overwhelmingly positive, but some analysts predicted the film could be impacted by the lack of a build in audience Crowe had at the time.

Box office
Gladiator was released in the United States and Canada on May 5, 2000. During its opening weekend, Gladiator earned $34.8 million across 2,938 theaters—an average of $11,851 per theater—making it the number one film of the weekend, ahead of U-571 ($7.8 million), in its third weekend, and The Flintstones in Viva Rock Vegas ($7.6 million), in its second weekend. The film not only crossed over Scream 3 to have the year's highest opening weekend, but also achieved the third-highest opening weekend for any R-rated film, trailing only behind Air Force One (1997) and Interview with the Vampire (1994). The film's positive word of mouth and the sex appeal of Crowe helped with bringing in a female audience during its opening weekend, with a percentage of women buying tickets increasing from 35% on its opening day to 45% the following day.

The film remained number one in its second weekend with $24.6 million, ahead of the debut of Battlefield Earth ($11.5 million). During its third weekend, Gladiator fell to second place with $19.7 million, behind the debut of Dinosaur ($38.5 million). By Memorial Day, it had already earned a total of $127.2 million, surpassing Erin Brockovich to become the highest-grossing film of the year. Without regaining the number one spot, Gladiator spend ten weeks in the top ten at the box office. The film was in theaters for over a year and finished its theatrical run on May 10, 2001. Gladiator grossed $187.7 million in the United States and Canada, finishing as the fourth highest-grossing film of 2000 behind Mission: Impossible 2 ($215.4 million), Cast Away ($233.6 million), and How The Grinch Stole Christmas ($260 million).

Outside of North America, Gladiator is estimated to have grossed over $272.9 million internationally. This gave the film a cumulative gross of over $460.6 million worldwide against a budget of $103 million. It was the second highest-grossing film of 2000 behind Mission: Impossible 2 ($546.4 million). 

Due to an increase in ticket prices, 2000 set a new record of $7.7 billion at the domestic box office, exceeding the previous year's $7.31 billion. However, attendance for the year was estimated at a 2.5% decrease from last year. Industry executives blamed the decrease in attendance on the year's slate for its lack of commercial appeal that 1999's slate had, a lack of female-driven films and sleeper hits, as well as several exhibition chains filling for bankruptcy. Nevertheless, Gladiator was considered to be one of 2000's blockbusters due to strong world of mouth that contributed to its leggiest performance and contributed to DreamWorks’ improving fortunes.

Reception

Critical response

Upon its initial release, Gladiator opened to generally positive reviews. Audiences polled by CinemaScore gave the film an average grade of "A" on an A+ to F scale.

The performances and the cast were praised by critics, with Crowe and Phoenix being considered by critics as the main highlights. Kirk Honeycutt of The Hollywood Reporter said Crowe "solidly anchors this epic-scale gladiator movie - the first in nearly four decades - by using his burly frame and expressive face to give dimension to what might otherwise have been comic book heroics." In his positive review for The Wall Street Journal, Joe Morgensten said that Crowe "doesn't use tricks in this role to court our approval. He earns it the old-fashioned way, by daring to be quiet, if not silent, and intensely, implacably strong," and that the film "rests on Mr. Crowe's armor-clad shoulders, and he carries it remarkably well." Empire's Ian Nathan, giving the film four stars, wrote that Phoenix displayed "gleeful hamminess" in his performance. Writing for the film, Nathan expressed that "while it's all grand opera, and driven by sweeping gestures and pompous, overwritten dialogue, it is prone to plain silliness - especially in granting us the big showdown at the close. But the sheer dynamism of the action, coupled with Hans Zimmer's lavish score and the forcefield of Crowe, still makes this a fiercesome competitor in the summer movie stakes." Geoff Andrew of Time Out praised the film, saying that "the cast is strong (notably Nielsen as Commodus's vacillating sister, and the late Oliver Reed, unusually endearing as a gladiator owner), the pacing lively, and the sets, swordplay and Scud catapults impressive. Roger Ebert, who was otherwise critical in his two-star review, praised Nielsen for having the most depth in the entire film.  On the other hand, Camille Paglia, who called the film "boring, badly shot and suffused with sentimental p.c. rubbish," criticized Crowe and Phoenix's performances

Scott's directing was generally praised by critics, whom called it a return to form for the director. In her A- review for Entertainment Weekly, Lisa Schwarzbaum praised Scott's directing, particularly during the opening battle sequence. Schwarzbaum writes that with the battle sequence, "Scott lets loose his own extraordinary assault. It’s a bravura sequence of flaming arrows, falling horses, and mortal combat that doesn’t copy Private Ryan‘s famous opening tour de force of carnage so much as raise a banner in admiration. It's Scott the visual artist at his most deluxe." Peter Bradshaw of The Guardian wrote that "Scott really scores in his big Rome set-pieces, especially Crowe's combat with men and tigers in a computer-enhanced Colosseum much bigger and more monumental than the original," and that "for all of its implausible silliness and towering high camp, Scott's movie tells an engaging story, and the central arena fight-sequence in which Maximus and his gladiators playing the doomed Carthaginians end up defeating the Romans and reversing history "to the emperor's horror" is wittily and adroitly done: a sly demonstration of the confluence of politics and mass entertainment." Michael Wilmington of The Chicago Tribune gave praise to Scott's direction, comparing the visual style of the film to that of Scott's 1982 film Blade Runner.

Critics generally praised the production values of the film, with the costumes, production design, and visual effects. Todd McCarthy, praising the film for Variety, said Gladiator "revels in both the glory and the horror that were Rome," with "details in Arthur Max's brilliant production design and Janty Yates’ highly diversified costume design that offered up in wonderfully offhand fashion," while also commanding the "CGI effects that have allowed numerous sets, notably the Colosseum, to be enhanced in size and spectacle value; the stunts, fights and battles are as forceful and realistic as anyone could want, John Mathieson’s widescreen cinematography is magnificent, and the pacing across 2½ hours is well modulated." Ebert criticized the film for looking "muddy, fuzzy and indistinct." In his two-star review, Ebert also derided the writing, saying it "employs depression as a substitute for personality, and believes that if characters are bitter and morose enough, we won't notice how dull they are."

Accolades

Despite the critical and commercial success it received during its theatrical run, Gladiator was not initially considered a major contender for the Academy Awards. When award season talk came around towards the end of 2000, critic and journalists simply viewed the film as an enjoyable summer film, but not a major Oscar contender. Gladiator and Erin Brockovich were singled out for their releases during the first half of the year, while awards contenders such as Almost Famous, Billy Elliot, Crouching Tiger, Hidden Dragon, and Traffic were released during the fall and winter of 2000 and received awards from numerous critics groups and guild organizations. When the film won the Golden Globe Award for Best Motion Picture - Drama at the 58th Golden Globes, media outlets began viewing Gladiator as the front runner for the Academy Awards. Its subsequent wins for the BAFTA Award for Best Film and Produces Guild of America Award for Best Theatrical Motion Picture solidfied Gladiator's front runner status for the Oscars.

When nominations for the 73rd Academy Awards were announced on February 13, 2001, Gladiator received the most nominations with twelve, while Crouching Tiger, Hidden Dragon had ten nominations. On March 25, 2001, the film won five Academy Awards: Best Picture, Best Actor for Russell Crowe, Best Visual Effects, Best Sound, and Best Costume Design. It was nominated for an additional seven: Best Original Screenplay, Best Supporting Actor for Joaquin Phoenix and Best Director for Ridley Scott, Best Original Score, Best Cinematography, Best Art Direction, and Best Film Editing. It was the first movie to win Best Picture without winning either a directing or screenwriting award since All the King's Men at the 22nd Academy Awards in 1950. This was also the second consecutive DreamWorks film to achieve an Oscar for Best Picture after American Beauty the previous year. Due to Academy rules, only Hans Zimmer was officially nominated for Best Original Score, and not Lisa Gerrard. However, the pair did win the Golden Globe Award for Best Original Score as co-composers. Of its one-hundred and nineteen award nominations, Gladiator won a total of forty-eight prizes.

Post-release

Historical authenticity 
Gladiator is loosely based on real events that occurred within the Roman Empire in the latter half of the 2nd century AD. As Ridley Scott wanted to portray Roman culture more accurately than in any previous film, he hired several historians as advisors. Nevertheless, some deviations from historical facts were made to increase interest, maintain narrative continuity, and for practical or safety reasons. Scott also stated that due to the influence of previous films affecting the public perception of what ancient Rome was like, some historical facts were "too unbelievable" to include. For instance, in an early version of the script, gladiators would have been carrying out product endorsements in the arena; while this would have been historically accurate, it was not filmed for fear that audiences would think it anachronistic. At least one historical advisor resigned due to these changes. Another asked not to be mentioned in the credits (though it was stated in the director's commentary that he constantly asked, "where is the proof that certain things were exactly like they say?"). Historian Allen Ward of the University of Connecticut believed that historical accuracy would not have made Gladiator less interesting or exciting, stating, "creative artists need to be granted some poetic license, but that should not be a permit for the wholesale disregard of facts in historical fiction".

Fictionalization 
Marcus Aurelius was not murdered by his son Commodus; he died at Vindobona (modern Vienna) in 180 AD from the Antonine Plague. The epidemic, believed to be either smallpox or measles, swept the Roman Empire during his reign. There is no indication Marcus Aurelius wished to return the Empire to a republican form of government, as depicted in the film. Moreover, he shared the rule of the Empire with Commodus for three years before his own death. Commodus then ruled alone from that point until his death at the end of 192 AD. The film depicts Marcus as defeating the barbarians in the Marcomannic Wars. In reality, the war was still ongoing when Aurelius died; Commodus secured peace by a treaty with the two Germanic tribes allied against Rome, the Marcomanni and the Quadi, immediately after his father's death.

Although Commodus engaged in show combat in the Colosseum, he was not killed in the arena; he was strangled in his bath by the wrestler Narcissus. Commodus reigned for over twelve years, unlike the shorter period portrayed in the film. In the film, Lucilla is portrayed as a lone widow of Lucius Verus with one son, also named Lucius Verus. While Lucilla was the widow of Verus and also had a son by that name, their son died young, long before the reign of Commodus, and Lucilla remarried Claudius Pompeianus soon after Verus' death. She had been married to him for 11 years by the time her brother became Emperor and her only living son during this time was Aurelius Pompeianus. The film omits Lucilla's other two children with Verus, Lucilla Plautia and Aurelia Lucilla. Lucilla was implicated in a plot to assassinate her brother in 182 AD, along with her stepson by Pompeianus and several others. She was first exiled to the island of Capri by her brother, then executed on his orders later in the year.

The character of Maximus is fictional, although in some respects he resembles the following historical figures: Narcissus, Commodus's real-life murderer and the character's name in the first draft of the screenplay; Spartacus, who led a significant slave revolt in 73–71 BC; Cincinnatus (519–430 BC), a farmer who was made dictator, saved Rome from invasion, then resigned his six-month appointment after 15 days; and Marcus Nonius Macrinus, a trusted general, consul in 154 AD, and friend of Marcus Aurelius. Maximus had a similar career (and personality traits as documented by Herodian) to Claudius Pompeianus (a Syrian) who married Marcus Aurelius' daughter Lucilla following the death of Lucius Verus. It is believed Aurelius may have wanted Pompeianus to succeed him as caesar, in preference to Commodus, but was turned down. Pompeianus had no part in any of the many plots against Commodus. He was not depicted in the film.

In the film the character Antonius Proximo claims "the wise" Marcus Aurelius banned gladiatorial games in Rome forcing him to move to Mauretania. The real Aurelius did ban games, but only in Antioch as punishment for the city's support of the usurper Avidius Cassius. No games were ever banned in Rome. However, when the Emperor started conscripting gladiators into the legions, the resulting shortage in fighters allowed lanistae such as Proximo to make "windfall" profits through increased charges for their services.

In real life, the death of Commodus did not result in peace for Rome, nor a return to the Roman Republic. Rather, it ushered in a chaotic and bloody power struggle that culminated in the Year of the Five Emperors of AD 193. According to Herodian, the people of Rome were overjoyed at the news of Commodus dying, although they feared that the praetorians would not accept the new emperor Pertinax.

"Maximus Decimus Meridius" does not appear to be a usual personal name for ancient Rome. A more accurate name would be "Decimus Meridius Maximus", as "Decimus" is a praenomen and "Maximus" is a cognomen. "Proximo" should be rendered as "Proximus."

Anachronisms 
Costumes in the film are rarely historically correct. Some of the soldiers wear fantasy helmets. The bands wrapped around their lower arms were rarely worn. Their appearance is the product of a filmic stereotype whereby historical films depict peoples of antiquity wearing such bands. Although the film is set within the 2nd century AD, the Imperial Gallic armor and the helmets worn by the legionaries are from AD 75, a century earlier. This was superseded by new designs in AD 100. The legions' standard bearers (aquiliferi), centurions, mounted forces, and auxiliaries would have worn scale armour, lorica squamata. The Germanic tribes are dressed in clothes from the Stone Age period.
Roman field artillery was used in combat quite extensively by the Romans, though within the film they are also depicted as using  onagers, which would not see use by the Roman Empire until the 4th century, hundreds of years after the events of the film.
The Roman cavalry are shown using stirrups. This is anachronistic in that the horse-mounted forces of the Roman army used a two-horned saddle, without stirrups. Stirrups were only employed in filming for safety reasons because of the additional training and skill required to ride with a Roman saddle. Catapults and ballistae would not have been used in a forest. They were reserved primarily for sieges and were rarely used in open battles. Fire pots fired from catapults were not used at any point in ancient history.

The Praetorian Guards seen in the film are all wearing purple uniforms. No historical evidence supports this. On campaign, they usually wore standard legionary equipment with some unique decorative elements.

Home media 
Gladiator was first released on DVD and VHS on November 21, 2000. Along with X-Men, both films generated $60 million in home video sales each in their first week. By this point, Gladiator had already sold 1.8 million DVD units, making it the fastest-selling DVD release. By January 2001, it would go on to break The Matrixs record for becoming the top-selling DVD release, selling 3.5 million copies. With over 5 million copies sold, the film would hold the record for being the best-selling DVD title of all time until Shrek surpassed it later that year.

The DVD has since been released in several different extended and special edition versions. Special features for the Blu-ray Disc and DVDs include deleted scenes, trailers, documentaries, commentaries, storyboards, image galleries, Easter eggs, and cast auditions. The film was released on Blu-ray in September 2009, in a 2-disc edition containing both the theatrical and extended cuts of the film, as part of Paramount's "Sapphire Series". Initial reviews of the Blu-ray Disc release criticized poor image quality, leading many to call for it to be remastered, as Sony did with The Fifth Element in 2007. A remastered version was later released in 2010.

The DVD editions that have been released since the original two-disc version, include a film-only single-disc edition as well as a three-disc "extended edition" DVD which was released in August 2005. The extended edition DVD features approximately fifteen minutes of additional scenes, most of which appear in the previous release as deleted scenes. The original cut, which Scott still calls his director's cut, is also selectable via seamless branching (which is not included on the UK edition). The DVD is also notable for having a new commentary track featuring director Scott and star Crowe. The film is on the first disc, the second one has a three-hour documentary into the making of the film by DVD producer Charles de Lauzirika, and the third disc contains supplements. Discs one and two of the three-disc extended edition were also repackaged and sold as a two-disc "special edition" in the EU in 2005. The film was released on Ultra HD Blu-ray by Paramount Home Media Distribution on May 15, 2018.

Thematic analysis

Revenge 
A common theme found in Gladiator is that of revenge. Throughout the film, Maximus' character arc revolves around the theme of revenge toward Commodus for betraying him and arranging the deaths of his wife, his son, and the emperor. Writing in the chapter "Gladiator and Contemporary American Society" of her book Big Screen Rome, Monica S. Cyrino argues that Maximus' revenge arc is driven by the alienation of Roman politics. Cyrino opines that Maximus is introduced as being patriotic and one who "fights for an ideal Rome because, never having been to the city. he has remained undefiled by the reality that Rome is rightful conqueror and civilizing force over the world. Maximus is soon betrayed by Commodus and "when he finds his wife and son mur­dered, it marked the moment of his alienation from everything he once valued." The loss of his family and emperor mentally breaks Maximus, who initially refuses to fight with the other gladiators and eventually cuts out the legion tattoo on his arm. This further solidifies Maximus’ alienation from Rome. Cyrino, who noted that "Maximus' alienation from a degenerate Rome and his deep-seated ambivalence about his role in restoring Roman government to the people suggests a parallel to post-Cold War America,” notes that even as there was a "temporary boost in the rhetoric of national unity and superficial displays of patri­otism after September 11, 2001, current political and social commenta­tors remark on the apathy of the American electorate, such as low voter turnout and a persistent lack of interest in political debate." When Maximus returns to Rome as a slave, "he eventually realizes what he has already begun to understand: "The mob is Rome."" Driven by his anger and isolation, Maximus’ resolution is to re-enact his ideal of Rome from within the arena. After he kills Commodus before he succumbs to his wounds, Maximus asks Quintus to reinstate Senator Gracchus in the hope that Gracchus will help to reinstate Marcus Aurelius' ideals.

Violence as spectacle 
Gladiator comments on the theme of violence in sports and as a spectacle for entertainment. Cyrino writes that "Gladiator evokes the influence of the superstar athlete in a child's wide-eyed worship of celebrity when young Lucius approaches Maximus, his new idol, as he waits in his cell to enter the arena." Franzoni himself was inspired by various sports agents and professional sports such as the NFL and WWE when writing the script. Cyrino believes that the film's "gladiatorial fights are reminiscent of the way in which con­temporary sports competitions, especially professional football and wrestling, are filmed for television," and that Logan employed a similar tactic for the screenplay for Oliver Stone's Any Given Sunday (1999), in which "the camera watches from a series of vantage points that are easily recognizable to any viewers of Monday Night Football." Cyrino argues that the film deconstructs the spectacle of violence through the lens of Maximus. After a victory in Zucchabar, Maximus throws his sword at the local viewing box and spits at the sand after displaying his contempt for the crowd. Cyrino argues that "the depiction of the Roman mob in Gladiator offers the American audience an unnerving mirror-image of themselves, eager to be entertained at all costs and demanding ever more intricate, dangerous, and realistic spectacles."

Masculinity and stoicism 
Themes of masculinity and stoicism are commentated throughout the film's plot. During the course of the film, Maximus is represented as a strong, fearless figure who is brave, loyal, and honest to those around him. Cyrino writes that Maximus' masculinity is defined through his upbringing as a farmer and a working-class hero. A signature trait from Maximus before he fights is that he gets dirt from the ground and wipe his hands dirty with them, signaling his personality as a man who isn't afraid to get his hands dirty. Cyrino states that Maximus' portrayal as "a simple man of the soil responds to modern society's idealization of the countryside and its supposed virtue and purity, in stark contrast to the crime-ridden metropolis." Maximus gains the support of his fellow gladiators and some of the senate over the course of the film through the way he behaves and acts.

Some philosophers have noted the role stoicism plays in the Maximus' masculinity. The real life Marcus Aurelius writes in Meditations that stoics must "concentrate on [their responsibilities] ... without getting stirred up or meeting anger with angers." Maximus' drive for vengeance has made him turn away from his responsibilities of a role model to his son until Lucilla confronts him in his cell that he realizes that his emotions are getting the better of him. When Commodus taunts Maximus about how his son "squealed like a girl when they nailed him to the cross," stoicism shines a light on Maximus by refusing to give into his anger and kill Commodus in front of the arena and resorts to telling Commodus that his "time for honoring himself will soon be at a end.” Instead of giving into his anger, Maximus slightly bows and refers to Commodus as “highness” instead of “emperor,” which later becomes a psychological and emotional blow to Commodus’ ego. Krysta Larson, writing in "Mother Knows Best? Evaluating the Roles of Stoic Parents in Gladiator," believed that "if it were stoically proper to continue in one’s role as a parent to a dead son, then Maximus would fulfill his role as a good Stoic father by pursuing virtuous goals and properly performing the deeds dictated by his roles rather than seeking revenge."

Commodus, on the other hand, is presented as the antithesis of Maximus. The film portrays Commodus as an immature, cowardly, and unreasonable man who is not fit for the demands of governing the Roman Empire. He openly complains, sobs, has trouble sleeping at night, and struggles to gain respect from the characters. The film characterizes Commodus with his sister as his only friend, with even his father openly admitting that his son is not moral. Driven by the lack of love obtained from his father, Commodus is "keen to acquire the love and respect of the Roman people that his father had enjoyed but criticizes Marcus Aurelius for his intellectualism." Cyrino compared Commodus to the presidency of George W. Bush, stating that like Commodus, "Bush employed rhetoric imbued with overly emotional and sometimes childish tones." Both Commodus and Bush, according to Cyrino, are "con­temptuous of guidance from advisory councils and express their scorn by means of anti-intellectual bluster." As it becomes clear Maximus is winning the respect of the crowd, Commodus becomes irritated and frustrated. When he purposefully taunts at Maximus about the deaths of his family in an effort to kill him after defying his order to kill Tigris of Gaul, Maximus rebukes him by calling him “highness” and that his time of honoring his narcissism will come to an end. This leads to him openly complaining and sobbing to Senator Falco later that night. Commodus’ amoral personality intensifies when he begins to lust after his own sister Lucilia and forces her to become his sex slave as punishment for her betrayal. Gladiator highlights the distinct personalities of Maximus and Commodus in the final battle. Prior to their duel, Commodus stabs Maximus in an effort to gain a hand, but this shows his cowardly demeanor as Quintus refuses to give him a second sword. Maximus' honor, determination, and discipline eventually overcomes Commodus' vanity, cruelty, and ambition when he stabs him in the neck.

Borrowing of Nazi imagery 
The film's depiction of Commodus's entry into Rome borrows imagery from Leni Riefenstahl's Nazi propaganda film Triumph of the Will (1935), although Scott has pointed out that the iconography of Nazi rallies was itself inspired by the Roman Empire. Gladiator reflects back on the film by duplicating similar events that occurred in Adolf Hitler's procession. The Nazi film opens with an aerial view of Hitler arriving in a plane, while Scott shows an aerial view of Rome, quickly followed by a shot of the large crowd of people watching Commodus pass them in a procession with his chariot. The first thing to appear in Triumph of the Will is a Nazi eagle, which is alluded to when a statue of an eagle sits atop one of the arches (and then is shortly followed by several more decorative eagles throughout the rest of the scene), leading up to the procession of Commodus. At one point in the Nazi film, a little girl gives flowers to Hitler, while Commodus is met by several girls who all give him bundles of flowers.

Legacy

Cultural influence 

Gladiator has been considered a cultural phenomenon since its release. Prior to the release of Gladiator, the swords and sandal genre had fallen out of public popularity by the mid-1960s following a string of expensive box office flops such as Cleopatra (1963) and The Fall of the Roman Empire (1964). In the 1990s, the historical epic genre saw a revival in popularity following the success of films such as Dances With Wolves (1990), Schindler's List (1993), Braveheart (1995), Titanic (1997), and Saving Private Ryan (1998). Gladiator continued these films' realism with more of a focus on the Ancient History, which had not been explored extensively since the 1960s.

In season 3 of the critically acclaimed HBO series, The Sopranos, antagonist Ralph Ciferetto develops an obsession with the film.

Retrospective reviews and film critics have noted that Gladiator's success spurred a revival of the historical epic genre with films during the 2000s and 2010s such as The Last Samurai (2003), Troy (2004), The Alamo (2004), King Arthur (2004), Alexander (2004), 300 (2007), and its sequel 300: Rise of an Empire (2014), Kingdom of Heaven (2005), Robin Hood (2010), Exodus: Gods and Kings (2014), and The Last Duel (2021) (the last four were also directed by Scott). The gladiator arena set piece from the Star Wars: Episode II – Attack of the Clones (2002), which entered production shortly after the release of Gladiator, has been compared to the arena setting in the film. While a majority of these films were critically and commercially successful in their own rights, The Guardian's Steve Rose argued that the historical epic revival devolved back into parody by 2007, as none of the films recaptures the impact of Gladiator. Rose also argued that after twenty years, the film's story was more relevant now than it was then with its themes of populism and fascism. Cineramble's James Humphreys wrote on the film's twentieth anniversary that the swords and sandal epic revival was short-lived because studios and producers focused more on Gladiator's visuals rather than the quality of its storytelling and characters. Humphreys, however, argued that the film influenced several films in the fantasy and superhero film genres more than the historical epic genre itself, with the film's aesthetics helping influence Peter Jackson's The Lord of the Rings trilogy (2001-2003), the Marvel Cinematic Universe (2008–present), and the DC Extended Unvierse (2013–present).

The film's mainstream success was also responsible for an increased interest in Roman and classical history in the United States. The Cicero biography Cicero: The Life and Times of Rome's Greatest Politician and Gregory Hays's translation of Marcus Aurelius's Meditations received large spikes in sales after the release of the film. According to The New York Times, this has been dubbed the "Gladiator Effect".

Gladiator had a cultural impact through various forms of media beyond cinema. The film influenced numerous television series such as Rome (2005-2007) and Game of Thrones (2011-2019). Jack Gleeson based his performance of Joffrey Baratheon in Game of Thrones on Phoenix's performance as Commodus. British-American underground hip-hop artist MF Doom's signature mask was inspired by the mask worn by Maximus in the film, having picked up one of the replicas that were sold following the film's success Dialogue such as "Are You Not Entertained," "Am I Not Merciful," "I Will Have My Vengeance," and "Strength and Honor" are among the most recognizable quotes and have become the subject of numerous internet memes. In 2009, Maximus was featured on 55c "Australian Legends" postage stamp series, with Crowe attending a ceremony to mark the creation of the stamps.

The film also had become a touchstone for the careers of its cast and crew. After Thelma & Louise (1991), Scott faced a string of critical and commercial flops during the 1990s including 1492: Conquest of Paradise (1992), White Squall (1996), and G.I. Jane (1997). Gladiator became a reversal of fortune for Scott, earning him his best acclaim and interest since Thelma and Louise. In the wake of Gladiators success, Scott followed up by directing Hannibal (2001), the highly anticipated sequel to The Silence of the Lambs (1991), and Black Hawk Down (2001). Gladiator, along with The Insider, helped elevate Russell Crowe into an established A-lister and worldwide fame. His performance in Gladiator resulted him landing top-billing roles in Ron Howard's A Beautiful Mind (2001) and Peter Weir's Master and Commander: The Far Side of the World (2003). Scott and Crowe would collaborate again for A Good Year (2006), American Gangster (2007), Body of Lies (2008), and Robin Hood (2010). Gladiator also brought fame for Phoenix, who would go on to be cast by M. Night Shyamalan for the films Signs (2002) and The Village (2004) and win the Academy Award for Best Actor for his performance as the Joker in Joker (2019). Harris' performance in Gladiator resulted in his casting as Albus Dumbledore in Harry Potter and the Philosopher's Stone (2001). Several members of the cast and crew have commented on the impact the film has had on their careers and its cultural legacy. In a 2020 interview with Yahoo!, Möller remarked that he continues to get recognized by many people for his performance as Hagen. Scott considers the film one of the top three favorite films he has directed. Crowe noted that the quality of the film has helped find new fans twenty years on television after its release. When being interviewed by Den of Geek in 2020, Wick said this about the film's impact.I think if you’ve been around for a while, one of the things you’ll learn is that if you look at a hundred years of movies, every cycle repeats, and it’s all about someone who will be able to reinvent it. Every 20 years there’ll be a vampire movie, and the 20-year-old versions usually start to look kitsch. Luckily with Gladiator that’s not the case.

Modern reception 
Today, Gladiator is considered to be one of the greatest action films ever made, one of the greatest historical epic films ever made, and one of the greatest films of both the 2000s decade and 21st Century.

On their "100 Best Movies Of All Time list", Empire ranked the film as the thirty-ninth best film ever made, and would also rank the film as the twenty-second best film of the 21st Century. Gladiator was also named one of the best films of the 21st Century by The Guardian, and was also included in Rotten Tomatoes' "The 140 Essential 2000 Movies."

Den of Geek and Collider both named Gladiator as the best historical epic ever made, and one of The Guardian's twenty-five best action and war films. Numerous websites including Vulture and /Film named Gladiator in the top ten films from Scott.

The film is also included in the book 1001 Movies You Must See Before You Die. The American Film Institute included Gladiator as one of the four-hundred films nominated for their AFI's 100 Years...100 Movies (10th Anniversary Edition) list, while ranking Maximus as the fiftieth greatest hero in film. The character of Maximus was placed 12th in the Total Film list of 50 best movie heroes and villains and 35th in the Empire's 100 Greatest Movie Characters.

On review aggregator Rotten Tomatoes, Gladiator has an approval rating of 79% based on 253 reviews, with an average rating of 7.40/10. The website's critical consensus reads, "While not everyone will be entertained by Gladiators glum revenge story, Russell Crowe thunderously wins the crowd with a star-making turn that provides Ridley Scott's opulent resurrection of Rome a bruised heart." On Metacritic, the film has a score of 67 out of 100, based on 46 critics, indicating "generally favorable reviews".

Sequel
In June 2001, developments for a Gladiator follow-up began in the form of potential for either a prequel or a sequel, with David Franzoni in early negotiations to once again serve as screenwriter. The following year, a sequel was announced to be moving forward with John Logan serving as screenwriter. The plot, set fifteen years later, included the Praetorian Guards rule of Rome and an older-aged Lucius searching for the truth about his biological father. Franzoni signed on as producer, alongside Douglas Wick and Walter Parkes. In December 2002, the film's plot was announced to include prequel events regarding the parentage of Lucius, as well as sequel events depicting the resurrection of Maximus. Producers and Russell Crowe collaboratively researched extensively, ancient Roman beliefs regarding the afterlife. By September 2003, Scott announced that the script was completed, while confirming that the story would primarily center around the secret son of Maximus, being Lucius.

In May 2006, Scott stated that while development on the project continues, the exact story to the film has yet to be figured out. The filmmaker stated that all creative minds that were involved with Gladiator, are working on how to continue from where the story left off. Scott stated that Crowe had favored a fantasy element that would bring Maximus back to life, while the filmmaker stated that he believes a grounded historical-fiction approach was the better option. The filmmaker confirmed that Lucius will be revealed as the son of Maximus and Lucilla, while stating that the script will be more complex compared to the first movie with the corruption of Rome. During this time, Nick Cave was commissioned to write a new draft of the script which he wrote under the working title of "Christ Killer". The writer described the plot as a "deities vs. deity vs. humanity" story, where the premise involved Maximus being resurrected as an immortal eternal warrior for the Roman gods, after living in purgatory since his death. The story would follow Maximus, who is sent to Earth and tasked with stopping the momentum of Christianity by killing Jesus Christ and His disciples, as their movement was gradually siphoning off the Pagan power and vitality. During this mission, Maximus is tricked into murdering his own son, and cursed to live forever, fighting amongst: the Crusades, WWII, and the Vietnam War. The ending would reveal that in modern-day, the character now works at The Pentagon. The script was ultimately rejected and scrapped. After experiencing financial difficulties in the 2000s, DreamWorks Pictures was sold to Paramount Pictures in 2006 and any development on the sequel was halted.

In March 2017, Scott stated that his concerns with prior difficulties of developing a script where Maximus is reintroduced after being deceased, had been resolved. The filmmaker expressed enthusiasm for the future of the project, while discussions with Russell Crowe to reprise his role were ongoing. In November 2018, it was announced that Paramount was officially green-lighting the development of a sequel, with Scott in early-negotiations to once again serve as director. The project would be a joint-venture production between Paramount, Scott Free Productions, and Parkes/MacDonald Productions with Universal as a co-financing partner. By June 2019, producers stated that they "wouldn't touch [Gladiator] unless we felt in a way to do it was legitimate." The script was revealed to take place 25–30 years after the first film. The plot is intended to center around Lucius. In April 2021, Chris Hemsworth approached Crowe with a proposal to become involved with the project. As a fan of the first installment, Hemsworth proposed serving as co-producer in order to see the film realized. While working together on Thor: Love and Thunder, the two actors shared additional ideas for where the story for a Gladiator 2 could go. By September 2021, Scott stated that the script was once again being worked on with his intention being to direct the sequel upon the completion of production on his current project, Napoleon.

In January 2023, Paul Mescal was in final talks to star in the upcoming sequel, as Lucius. Working from a script written by David Scarpa, Scott will produce the film alongside Michael Pruss, Doug Wick and Lucy Fisher. Janty Yates and Arthur Max, the costume designer and production designer, respectively, of the original film are also set to return for the sequel. Later that month, Crowe stated that the story will center around Lucius becoming emperor, while stating that he will not be involved in the project. The film is scheduled to be released in the United States on November 22, 2024. In March 2023, Denzel Washington and Barry Keoghan joined the film.

See also

 List of films set in ancient Rome
 List of historical period drama films

References

Sources

Further reading

Cyrino, Monica S. Gladiator and contemporary American society. na, 2004.
 
 
Hodges, Richard. "Escapism for lovers of Ridley Scott's Gladiator–CORRIGENDUM." Journal of Roman Archaeology 34, no. 2 (2021): 1000-1000.
 
Rushton, Richard. "Narrative and Spectacle in" Gladiator"." CineAction (2001): 34-43.
Solomon, Jon. Gladiator from screenplay to screen. na, 2004.
 
 Stephens, William (2012). "Appendix: Marcus, Maximus, and Stoicism in Gladiator (2000)", in Marcus Aurelius: A Guide for the Perplexed. London: Continuum. 
Thomassen, Lasse. "Gladiator, Violence, and the Founding of a Republic." PS: Political Science & Politics 42, no. 1 (2009): 145–148.
Tillman, Joakim. "Topoi and intertextuality: Narrative function in Hans Zimmer’s and Lisa Gerrard’s music to Gladiator." In Music in Epic Film, pp. 73–99. Routledge, 2016.
 
Weiner, Marc A. "Hollywood’s German Fantasy: Ridley Scott’s Gladiator’." Wagner and cinema (2010): 186-209.
Wilson, Rob. "Ridley Scott’s Gladiator and the Spectacle of Empire: Global/Local Rumblings Inside the Pax Americana,’." European Journal of American Culture 21, no. 2 (2002): 62–73.

External links

 
 
 
 
 
 

 
2000 drama films
2000 films
2000s action drama films
2000s adventure films
2000s historical films
2000s English-language films
American action drama films
American epic films
American films about revenge
American historical films
BAFTA winners (films)
Best Drama Picture Golden Globe winners
Best Film BAFTA Award winners
Best Picture Academy Award winners
British action films
British drama films
British epic films
British films about revenge
British historical films
Cultural depictions of Commodus
Cultural depictions of Lucilla
Cultural depictions of Marcus Aurelius
DreamWorks Pictures films
Fiction about regicide
Fiction about familicide
Films about child death
Films about death
Films about gladiatorial combat
Films set in Africa
Films set in Algeria
Films set in Austria
Films set in ancient Rome
Films set in the Roman Empire
Films set in Italy
Films set in the 2nd century
Films shot in England
Films shot in Italy
Films shot in Malta
Films shot in Morocco
Films featuring a Best Actor Academy Award-winning performance
Films that won the Best Costume Design Academy Award
Films that won the Best Sound Mixing Academy Award
Films that won the Best Visual Effects Academy Award
Films scored by Hans Zimmer
Films produced by Douglas Wick
Films directed by Ridley Scott
Films with screenplays by John Logan
Films with screenplays by William Nicholson
Historical epic films
Incest in film
Nerva–Antonine dynasty
Patricide in fiction
Scott Free Productions films
Universal Pictures films
2000s American films
2000s British films